Kenneth Lealand Rowe (born April 22, 1989) is a former Canadian football defensive end in the Canadian Football League (CFL). He played for the Saskatchewan Roughriders. He played college football at Oregon.

Rowe was the MVP of the 2010 Rose Bowl.

References

External links
Oregon Ducks bio

1989 births
Living people
Players of Canadian football from Long Beach, California
Players of American football from Long Beach, California
American football defensive ends
American football linebackers
Canadian football defensive linemen
Oregon Ducks football players
Saskatchewan Roughriders players
American players of Canadian football